Santa María Quiegolani is a town and municipality in Oaxaca in south-western Mexico.  
It is part of the Yautepec District in the east of the Sierra Sur Region.

Name
The name is derived from Zapotec meaning "carved rock" or possibly "within the river".

Environment
The municipality covers an area of 122.48 km² at an elevation of 2,160 meters above sea level in the Sierra Madre del Sur mountains. The climate is mild and humid. Trees include  pine, oak, mahogany, cedar, ash, Tepehuaje, guanacastle, cuachipilin, Nopo and pochote.  Mango, plum, avocado, sapodilla, mamey, peach, granaditas, plum, orange and lemon grow in the area.

Wild animals include fox, coyote, cougar, deer, squirrel, badger, armadillo, ocelot, lion, raccoon, opossum, skunk, chupamiel, boar and tepexcuintle.  There are iguana, lizard, chintete, turtle, rattlesnake, coral snake and boa.

People
As of 2005, the municipality had 317 households with a total population of 1,537 of whom 1,240 spoke an indigenous language. The main economic activity is agriculture, growing maize, sorghum, peanuts and other crops such as beans, coffee and various fruits.  About 30% of households raise pigs or goats. Hunting and fishing are practiced for self consumption. There is some logging of maguey and timber.

See also 
Quiegolani Zapotec

References

Municipalities of Oaxaca